Shouting or screaming is speaking in a very loud voice.

Shouting may also refer to:
Shouting (computing), in running text, use of ALL CAPITALS
Shouting, buying a round of drinks
Shout (paying), Australian usage

See also